David Lee McInnis (born December 12, 1973) is an American actor based in Seoul. He has worked in South Korea since 1999.

Early life
McInnis is the only child of an American father of German and Irish descent and Korean mother who is a native of Jinju, South Gyeongsang Province, Thomas and Diana McInnis (née Lee Suk-hyang; 이숙향). Thomas served in the US Army in Korea, and David was born in Green Bay, Wisconsin and grew up in Antigo, Wisconsin and Honolulu, Hawaii. He is of German, Irish, and Korean heritage.

Career
McInnis debuted as an actor in the 1999 American indie crime thriller The Cut Runs Deep, which was an underground hit in South Korea, where McInnis moved to soon after quitting school, and achieved noticeable success in the Asian film industry. He was the face of SK Telecom's UTO division from 2001 to 2003 while in Korea, and his early Asian film credits include a supporting cast role in A Moment to Remember.

After a period of introspection, McInnis returned to the limelight with a leading role in Typhoon, a big-budget South Korean action film released in 2005. McInnis went on to star in the critically-acclaimed American-Korean romance film Never Forever, then took on a supporting role in Epitaph, and guest-starred in MBC's television series Air City.

McInnis set up a spice business, McInnis MasterBlend, in 2006 with his father.

On April 21, 2016, McInnis appeared on SM STATION's music video with Lee Joo Young entitled "Pain Poem". It was sung by Kim Bum Soo and produced by KENZIE. He also acted in the famous Korean drama Descendants of the Sun (2016) as David Argus.

In March 2018, McInnis signed with the management agency Saram Entertainment.

Filmography

Film

Television

Web

Music video appearances

Variety shows

References

External links

 
 

1973 births
Living people
American male film actors
American male television actors
People from Green Bay, Wisconsin
American people of German descent
American people of Irish descent
American male actors of Korean descent
American expatriates in South Korea
20th-century American male actors
21st-century American male actors
People from Antigo, Wisconsin